Clinopodium menthifolium, commonly known as the wood calamint or woodland calamint, is a species of flowering plant in the mint family, Lamiaceae. It is found throughout southern and central Europe from the United Kingdom and east as far as temperate parts of Asia, and as south as North Africa.

The three subspecies of C. menthifolium have been previously considered separate species, including C. m. subsp. ascendens (syn. C. ascendens), the common calamint or ascending wild basil, and C. m. subsp. hirtum (C. hirtum).

Taxonomy

The wood calamint was first formally named in 1831 by Nicolaus Thomas Host as Calamintha menthifolia.

Three subspecies are accepted:
 Clinopodium menthifolium subsp. menthifolium  – commonly called Calamintha sylvatica
 Clinopodium menthifolium subsp. ascendens  – commonly called Calamintha ascendens
 Clinopodium menthifolium subsp. hirtum  – commonly called Calamintha hirtaDescriptionClinopodium menthifolium subsp. menthifolium is a tufted, hairy, mint-scented perennial herb with an upright habit and few branches. The leaves are dark green, stalked and grow in opposite pairs. The leaf blades are ovate with rounded teeth and are larger than those C. menthifolium subsp. ascendens. This perennial rhizomatous herbaceous hemicryptophyte plant has stalked leaves and an erect hairy stem with tall flowering spikes. It produces pinkish or bluish flowers with spots on the white lower lip. They bloom from July to September.

Distribution and habitat
Wood calamint is native to Western Europe and North Africa. Its range extends from France and Germany south to Spain and Algeria, and it also known from Northern Syria. In Britain, it is limited to a single site in the Isle of Wight, where it grows in ancient deciduous woodland on a chalk soil. It has been introduced into the United States where it has become naturalised in California and Virginia.Clinopodium menthifolium subsp. ascendens occurs on dry, calcareous soils in hedges, roadsides, grasslands and rocky grounds.

Uses
The leaves of wood calamint can be infused to make an aromatic herb tea. They can also be added to cooked foods, imparting a pungent, aromatic flavour that has been described as being a combination of the flavours imparted by marjoram and mint. The plant is also used as an ornamental for garden cultivation, and will attract butterflies and bees.

The plant has also been used medicinally, as a diaphoretic and an expectorant, and to settle the stomach. It can be added to cough medicine, often in combination with yarrow (Achillea millefolium) and thyme (Thymus vulgaris''). It is also used to treat fever, insomnia and depression.

References

menthifolium
Flora of Europe
Flora of North Africa